Edificio Serrano is a 1932 art deco residential building at 123 Avenida México in colonia Hipódromo in the Condesa area of Mexico City. The architect was Francisco J. Serrano.

Author Marisol Flores notes that the building was unconventional for the time, thus reflecting modernity, due to the incorporation of curves (whereas previously rooms were nearly always rectangular), as well as American elements such as closets, a roof garden and foyers.

References

Buildings and structures in Mexico City
Art Deco architecture in Mexico
Condesa
Residential buildings completed in 1932